The Sachs-Webster House or Farmstead is an historic site and structure located in Laveen, Arizona. On the farmstead is a turn-of-the-20th-Century Sears Catalog Home built by "the original settlers of the community of Laveen".

References

Houses completed in 1909
Houses in Maricopa County, Arizona
Sears Modern Homes
1909 establishments in Arizona Territory